Lycopodiella appressa, commonly known as southern bog clubmoss, is a species of clubmoss. It is native to
eastern North America, including Cuba and the West Indies. In the United States, it is primarily found on the Coastal Plain.

Its natural habitat is open wet areas, such as bogs, seeps, and pond shores.

References

Lycopodiaceae
Taxa named by Alvan Wentworth Chapman